Candace Gingrich (born June 2, 1966) is an American LGBT rights activist at the Human Rights Campaign. Candace is the half-sibling of former Speaker of the House Newt Gingrich.

Biography
Candace Gingrich was born to Robert and Kathleen (Daugherty) Gingrich on June 2, 1966. Gingrich attended high school at Central Dauphin East High School in Harrisburg, Pennsylvania, and graduated from Indiana University of Pennsylvania in 1989.

Professional work
Although Gingrich's sexual orientation was publicly reported on as early as 1994, they first gained significant press attention in 1995 as a spokesperson for gay rights. They served as the Human Rights Campaign's National Coming Out Project Spokesperson for 1995 and were named one of Esquire'''s "Women We Love" and "Women of the Year" for Ms. magazine. They are currently the Senior Manager of the Human Rights Campaign's Youth & Campus Outreach, as well as the Human Rights Campaign's HRC University Internship Program coordinator. Their autobiography, Accidental Activist: A Personal and Political Memoir, was released in 1996.

Public appearances
Gingrich has guest-starred on the television sitcom Friends in January 1996, in which they officiated over a commitment ceremony for two recurring characters in the episode "The One With the Lesbian Wedding". They also appeared on the debut of Al Franken's TV program Lateline in 1998.

Gingrich endorsed President Barack Obama in 2012, despite Newt Gingrich's candidacy for the Republican nomination.

Personal life
Gingrich married playwright Rebecca Jones in 2009. The Gingrich-Joneses lived in Hyattsville, Maryland, where Gingrich played rugby with the Washington Furies. The couple initiated their divorce in 2013. In 2017, Gingrich married Kelly Cassidy, a member of the Illinois House of Representatives.

Gingrich is genderqueer and a lesbian and goes by they/them pronouns.

See also
 Gingrich appears in A Union in Wait'', a 2001 documentary film about same-sex marriage.

References

External links
 
 

1966 births
20th-century American non-fiction writers
21st-century American non-fiction writers
Activists from Pennsylvania
American humanists
American memoirists
American bloggers
American lesbian writers
LGBT people from Maryland
LGBT people from Pennsylvania
American LGBT rights activists
People with non-binary gender identities
Living people
Newt Gingrich
Writers from Harrisburg, Pennsylvania
People from Hyattsville, Maryland
Writers from Maryland
Non-binary activists
American non-binary writers